The Albania women's national football team represents the country of Albania in international football and is controlled by the Albanian Football Association which is headquartered in the city of Tirana. The team is affiliated with UEFA and competes in the two major professional tournaments, the FIFA World Cup and the UEFA European Championship.

Women's football was long met with skepticism in Albania, and the first recorded tournament took place as late as 2007, before the FSHF formed the Albanian Women's National Championship in 2009, which is the only women's league in the country. The rise in popularity of the sport among women led to the formation of the Albania national team in 2011, and they made their debut in a friendly match against Macedonia that ended in a 1–0 win. The current head coach is Armir Grimaj, replacing Altin Rraklli who was in charge from the formation in 2011 until 2016.

History
The Albanian women's national football team was formed in 2011 and made their debut in a friendly against Macedonia FYR on 5 May 2011 at the Gjorgji Kyçyku Stadium. The match ended 1–0 with Albania's first win and midfielder Aurora Seranaj scoring the first goal for Albania.

Towards the end of 2011, the national team strengthened its squad with the arrival of football players from the Albanian diaspora communities, notably Furtuna Velaj, Dafina Memedov, Ellvana Curo, Elizabeta Ejupi, Arjeta Krasniqi and Arbnora Robelli. The national team ended the year with their second win against Macedonia FYR away in Struga.
 The second victory against Macedonia FYR is currently the national team's biggest win.

On 15 May 2012, Albania faced Montenegro in Bar and won 4–2.
 Three days later, the Albanian team won again with a rematch against Montenegro, winning 4–3 at the Loro Boriçi Stadium in Shkodër.
 On 22 May, Albania encountered Macedonia FYR again, winning 2–0 with 2 goals from Suada Jashari.
 The national team had so far been undefeated in 5 games, with 15 goals scored, and 6 goals conceded. On 29 August, The Albania national team participated in an unofficial football tournament held in Drama. The national team drew 1–1 with Amazons Drama and lost 0–3 to Greece.

Team image

Kits and crest

Kit suppliers

Home stadium
The Elbasan Arena is currently the national stadium of the Albania women's national football team. The first home match in the country was played in the Gjorgji Kyçyku Stadium of Pogradec in May 2011. Following the completion, the National Arena in Tirana will be the home venue of both the men's and women's national team.

In November 2013, Qemal Stafa Stadium was shut down by FIFA for not fulfilling international standards. During the period of friendly games and the Euro qualifier with Greece in 2015, the women's team used the Loni Papuçiu Stadium in Fier to hold their matches. The Qemal Stafa Stadium held the match between France and Albania on 27 November 2015.

Results and fixtures

This Is the schedule of past & upcoming games for the Albania women's football team.

Legend

2022

Coaching staff

Current coaching staff

Manager history

 Altin Rraklli (5 May 2011 – 22 April 2016)
 Armir Grimaj (22 April 2016–present)

Players

Current squad

Caps and goals accurate up to and including 27 November 2020.

Recent call ups
The following players have been called up to the squad in the past 12 months.

Records

Individual

*Active players in bold.

Most capped players

Statistics correct as of 2020.

Top goalscorers

Competitive record

FIFA Women's World Cup

*Draws include knockout matches decided on penalty kicks.

UEFA Women's Championship

Head-to-head record

See also
Sport in Albania
Football in Albania
Women's football in Albania
Albania women's national football team
Albania women's national football team results
List of Albania women's international footballers
Albania women's national under-19 football team
Albania women's national under-17 football team

References

External links
Official website
FIFA profile

 
European women's national association football teams
National team
2011 establishments in Albania